Tripedaliidae is a family of box jellyfish within class Cubozoa.

Species
 Copula Bentlage, Cartwright, Yanagihara, Lewis, Richards & Collins, 2010
 Copula sivickisi (Stiasny, 1926)
 Tripedalia Conant, 1897
 Tripedalia binata Moore, 1988
 Tripedalia cystophora Conant, 1897

References

 
Carybdeida
Cnidarian families